Maurice (Moses) Abraham Cohen (1851 – 26 June 1923) was a linguist and pioneer of Jewish education in Sydney, Australia.

Cohen was born in the Polish/Ukrainian town of Rava-Ruska to a Polish-Jewish family of Sephardic origin, being a direct descendant of Abraham De Mosso Cohen, the Rabbi who established the Spanish-Jewish community of Zamość. Maurice Abraham moved to the UK at an early age to be educated at Jews College, London.

He died on 26 June 1923 at age 72, and was survived by six sons.

Career
After completing his education, Cohen worked as a teacher before travelling to India. Here he was headmaster at the Sassoon school in Bombay while taking a degree at the Bombay University. He then served as the personal translator for General Roberts, commander of British Forces in Afghanistan during the Second Anglo-Afghan War. In 1887, after home leave in England, he travelled to Australia where he took up a role as the first headmaster of the Jewish Sunday School that had recently been established in Sydney. He went on to be appointed head of the NSW Jewish Board of Education.

Cohen was regarded as a world expert on the language of Urdu during his lifetime. He was one time editor of Sydney's first Jewish weekly newspaper as well as a lecturer on Hebrew at a number of theological colleges in Australia. Maurice Abraham Cohen was fluent and also taught Yiddish, Ladino, Spanish, German, Aramaic, Amharic and Arabic.

Social commentator
Cohen was one of the first European Australians to call attention to the plight of the Australian Aborigines and argue for compensation and land rights, even risking his position as editor of the Australian Hebrew with his fiery opinion pieces on the subject. He also argued for increased non-discriminatory immigration drawing from all cultures and vehemently opposed the White Australia Policy.

References

Australian Jews
1851 births
1923 deaths
Linguists of Urdu
Ukrainian emigrants to Australia
Ukrainian Jews
Australian people of Ukrainian-Jewish descent
Australian people of Polish-Jewish descent